Spanner Forbes (2 January 1873 – 17 September 1955) was a South African international rugby union player who played as a centre.

He made 1 appearance for South Africa against the British Lions in 1896.

References

South African rugby union players
South Africa international rugby union players
1873 births
1955 deaths
Rugby union centres
Rugby union players from Victoria (Australia)